Millbrook is a city in Autauga and Elmore counties in the U.S. state of Alabama. The population was 16,564 at the 2020 census, up from 14,640 in 2010. It is part of the Montgomery Metropolitan Statistical Area.

Geography
Millbrook is located at  (32.502054, -86.374456).

Climate
According to the Köppen climate classification, Millbrook has a humid subtropical climate (abbreviated Cfa).

History
Millbrook includes the former village of Robinson Springs within its boundaries.  Numerous eras delineate Millbrook's past.

The area's first permanent home "Ellerslie" was completed in 1818 by Georgia Congressman, and Revolutionary War Veteran Bolling Hall.  The area's second permanent home "Thornfield" was started the following year, and completed in 1820 by pioneer Archibald McKeithen. Both homes still stand, and are private residences.

After its initial settlement, Robinson Springs was known as an early summer resort for wealthy families of Montgomery, and the vicinity.  The Robinson Springs United Methodist Church was formed in 1828. The settlers quickly grew out of the log structure, and decided to build a permanent structure. The present church was completed in 1848. The parsonage was sold soon after completion (due to the lack of a steady minister) to noted  Alabama historian Albert J. Pickett.  It still stands two doors down from the church.  In 1852, Robinson Springs played host to Alabama's first state fair.

Shadrack Mims, Autauga's early historian, describes Robinson Springs (circa 1850) as "a spot selected by Todd Robinson as a retreat from the river; and much good sense did he show in such selection - for, if the whole South was searched over, a more healthy spot, in my opinion, could not be found. It is altogether rural in its appearance, the forest growth being untouched, only for garden spots. As to water, it cannot be excelled any where for coolness, clearness, and pleasantness, and the abundance of it. The building situations are beautiful. Upon the whole, it is just the place for a summer retreat; just the place for a school - healthy and high, and free from the temptations so common in villages and cities."

1861 saw many of the area's youth go off to fight in the Civil War. In June 1862, Private Bolling Hall III, on leave from fighting in Virginia,  mustered a company of men under a tree at the current site of the confederate monument.  They elected him captain, and the company a part of Hilliards Legion. Remnants were later morphed into the 59th Alabama Infantry, with Colonel Bolling Hall III commanding. No remarkable events took place here during the war.

During the post-World War I and pre-World War II period, the communities of Millbrook, Coosada, and Robinson Springs, later referred to as the Tri-Community, began to evolve into populated growing communities, complete with schools, churches, and rail transportation.

Contributing to the population growth during the 1920s and 1930s were unfortunate outbreaks of disease in the more populated City of Montgomery. During this period, Millbrook became a place to retreat during the long, hot summers. Seasonal homes and cabins in Millbrook, Coosada, and Robinson Springs offered families fresh country air and seclusion. Soon, the seasonal population began to stay year round. Churches were quickly established and schools took form. The Bolling Hall School, the Lumley School, and later Robinson Springs School, served the increasing population. Some chose to continue their education in nearby Montgomery and traveled daily by train from Millbrook. Additionally, railroad transportation provided the growing population access to jobs in nearby cities. The railroad spur line of the early 1900s followed the present day route of Grandview Road.

As in the 1930s, much of today's progress is linked to transportation. With the introduction of Interstate 65 in the mid 1970s, Millbrook's growth led to formal incorporation as a city in 1977. Once again, those seeking a more relaxing lifestyle discovered the interstate exits immediately north of the state capital and the Millbrook population grew even more.

Demographics

2020 census

As of the 2020 United States census, there were 16,564 people, 6,061 households, and 4,226 families residing in the city.

2010 census
As of the census of 2010, there were 14,640 people, 5,446 households, and 4,069 families residing in the city. The racial makeup of the city was 74.2% White, 21.6% Black or African American, 0.4% Native American, 0.8% Asian, 0.05% Pacific Islander, 1.0% from other races, and 2.0% from two or more races.  2.8% of the population were Hispanic or Latino of any race.

There were 5,446 households, out of which 37.8% had children under the age of 18 living with them, 55.3% were married couples living together, 4.6% had a male householder with no wife present, 14.8% had a female householder with no husband present, and 25.3% were non-families. 21.3% of all households were made up of individuals, and 6.1% had someone living alone who was 65 years of age or older.  The average household size was 2.69 and the average family size was 3.12.

In the city, the population was spread out, with 27.8% under the age of 18, 9.0% from 18 to 24, 29.1% from 25 to 44, 24.9% from 45 to 64, and 9.3% who were 65 years of age or older.  The median age was 34.7 years. For every 100 females, there were 93.7 males.  For every 100 females age 18 and over, there were 87.3 males.

In 2000, the median income for a household in the city was $43,838, and the median income for a family was $47,004. Males had a median income of $34,893 versus $23,998 for females. The per capita income for the city was $17,189.  About 7.4% of families and 8.9% of the population were below the poverty line, including 13.3% of those under age 18 and 5.7% of those age 65 or over.

Education
The Elmore County portion is in the Elmore County Public School System.

The Autauga County portion is in the Autauga County Schools district.

Chapman Christian Academy is in the Elmore County Public district. CCA is a small Christian private school that has been serving the public for over 27 years and even though this school is mainly known to the local community it serves a valuable service for some families in Elmore County.

Nearby attractions
 Spectre set ruins – In the 2003 film Big Fish, the lead character visits the idealistic town of Spectre at multiple points in his life. In reality, the facades of Spectre were built on a private island on the Alabama River. A rundown version of the town was the last to be filmed, so when the sets were abandoned, they already looked as though they had been neglected for decades.

Notable people
 Austin Adams, pitcher for the Detroit Tigers
 Robert Chancey, former NFL running back
 Terrence Long, former Major League Baseball outfielder
 Dee Milliner, former NFL cornerback
 Antowain Smith, former NFL running back

See also
 Stanhope Elmore High School

References

External links
 City website
 Chamber of Commerce
 The Prattville Guide Website 

Cities in Alabama
Cities in Autauga County, Alabama
Cities in Elmore County, Alabama
Montgomery metropolitan area
1818 establishments in Alabama Territory
Populated places established in 1818